The Merces Baronetcy, of France, was a title in the Baronetage of England.  It was created on 2 April 1660 for Anthony de Merces, a French gentleman.  However, nothing further is known of him or any possible descendants.

Merces baronets, of France (1660)
Sir Anthony de Merces, 1st Baronet

References

Extinct baronetcies in the Baronetage of England